El Estrecho Airport  is an airport serving the town of El Estrecho (es) in the Loreto Region of Peru. The town is on the Putumayo River, which forms most of the border between Colombia and Peru.

Airlines and Destinations

See also

Transport in Peru
List of airports in Peru

References

External links
OpenStreetMap - El Estrecho
OurAirports - El Estrecho
SkyVector - El Estrecho
El Estrecho Airport

Airports in Peru
Buildings and structures in Loreto Region